Milton Carpenter (March 4, 1905 – November 19, 1996) was an American politician. He served as the State Treasurer of Missouri from 1961 to 1965.

References

1905 births
1996 deaths
State treasurers of Missouri
Missouri Democrats
20th-century American politicians